Chelis mira is a moth in the family Erebidae. It was described by Vladimir Viktorovitch Dubatolov and Yuri A. Tshistjakov in 1989. It is found in the south-eastern Altai Mountains (the Kuraiskii Range).

This species was moved from the genus Palearctia to Chelis as a result of phylogenetic research published in 2016.

References

Moths described in 1989
Arctiina